Julien Anziani (born 23 June 1999) is a French professional footballer who plays as a midfielder for  club USL Dunkerque.

Club career
Anziani signed his first professional contract with Gazélec Ajaccio on 20 June 2017. He made his professional debut for Gazélec Ajaccio in a 5–0 Ligue 2 loss to Reims on 19 September 2017.

In 2020, Anziani signed for Avranches. In August 2021, he moved to Bastia-Borgo.

On 3 June 2022, Anziani agreed to join Dunkerque for the 2022–23 season.

Career statistics

References

External links
 
 
 
 GFCA Profile

1999 births
Living people
French footballers
Footballers from Corsica
Association football midfielders
Gazélec Ajaccio players
US Avranches players
FC Bastia-Borgo players
USL Dunkerque players
Ligue 2 players
Championnat National players
Championnat National 3 players
Sportspeople from Ajaccio